The Goat Horn (translit. Koziyat rog) is a 1972 Bulgarian drama film directed by Metodi Andonov, starring Anton Gorchev and Katya Paskaleva. The film is set in 17th Century Bulgaria where Kara Ivan's wife is raped and killed by four local Ottoman feudal masters. Having disguised his daughter as a boy, and trained her in the masculine art of warfare over a period of ten years, they set out to take revenge.

The film won a Special Prize of the Jury at the Karlovy Vary International Film Festival. The Goat Horn was selected as the Bulgarian entry for the Best Foreign Language Film at the 45th Academy Awards, but was not accepted as a nominee.

Cast
 Katya Paskaleva as Maria
 Anton Gorchev as Kara Ivan
 Milen Penev as The sheep herder
 Todor Kolev as Deli
 Kliment Denchev as Turkish man
 Stefan Mavrodiyev as Mustafa
 Nevena Andonova as Maria (as a child)
 Marin Yanev as Rapist
 Krasimira Petrova as Mustafa's lover

Reception
According to the Spanish journalist Moncho Alpuente, due to the sexual repression in Francoist Spain, arthouse cinemas were frequented by people expecting to watch more skin than what censorship allowed in commercial theaters. As a result, The Goat Horn was a box-office hit in Spain since the censorship board had allowed sexual scenes.

See also
 List of submissions to the 45th Academy Awards for Best Foreign Language Film
 List of Bulgarian submissions for the Academy Award for Best Foreign Language Film

References

External links
 

1972 films
1972 drama films
Bulgarian drama films
Bulgarian black-and-white films
1970s Bulgarian-language films
Films set in the Ottoman Empire
Films set in the 17th century
Films directed by Metodi Andonov
Rape and revenge films